Crimean Tatars national football team is a football team representing Crimean Tatars in international tournaments. Temporary member NF-Board, ruled by the Crimean Tatar Football Union. The team is not associated with the Ukrainian Association of Football, but it is supported by the Mejlis of the Crimean Tatar People which in the Russian Federation recognised as an extremist organization.

History 
The national team was formed in 2006 based on a university team of the Crimean Engineer and Pedagogical University and associated with revival and development of Crimean Tatars identity following dissolution of the Soviet Union and return of Crimean Tatars to Crimea.

In 2006 the newly established team entered the ELF Cup tournament, organized by the Unrecognized Turkish Northern Cyprus Football Federation, a member of the NF-Board. The team played 5 matches in the tournament and reached the final, losing to the hosts in the final 1: 3 and knocking out a FIFA member in the semifinals, Kyrgyzstan national football team. The team led by Rustem Osmanov was declared:
Goalkeepers: Nariman Osmanov (Neftchi Fergana), Nariman Yakubov (Krymteplitsa), Seyid-Devlet Abduramanov (Medic Simferopol).
Defenders: Arsen Mustafayev (Phoenix-Illichivets), Fevzi Ebubekirov (Krymgeofizika), Rizvan Ablitarov (Dnipro Dnepropetrovsk), Denys Holaydo (Tavria; not Tatar, but was recommended to the national team).
Midfielders: Arsen Ablyametov (Chemist Krasnoperekopsk), Dzhambek Ablyakimov (Oilman Fergana), Fakhri Dzhelyalov (CSKA Moscow), Irfan Ametov (Irfanlomet Tallinn), Ruslan Dzhemilev (Medic), Marlene Ablyatipov, 21 years old (Crimegeophysics).
Forwards: Ruslan Emirratli, Khalil Khayredinov (Krymteplitsa), Rustem Mukhamedzhanov, 15 years old (UOR).

In 2016, the team again went to the football tournament Europeada - the European Championship among national minorities, which was held in South Tyrol. The team was declared under the name "Adalet" and consisted of athletes from the Crimea, Lviv, Kiev and several Ukrainian cities. She won the opening match of the group stage against West Thracian Muslims 3–0, but then lost to the Romanian Hungarians and Ladinia with a score of 1–6 and 0–8 respectively and completed the performance. The following players with playing coaches Elvin Kadyrov and Elnur Amietov :
 Shevekt Dzhaparov, Ennan Ashirov, Timur Kanataev, Arsen Yakubov, Lenzi Ablitarov, Esat Alimov, Diliaver Osmanov, Elzar Ablyamitov, Ibrahim Aliyev, Fikret Alimov, Rustem Ablyaev, Arthur Temirov, Talat Bilyalov, Islyam Useynov.

The team is not associated with Crimea national football team, created in 2017 on the territory of Republic of Crimea and Sevastopol - it is subordinate Crimean Football union.

See also 
 Crimean Premier League
 Football in Crimea
 Crimea national football team

References 

European national and official selection-teams not affiliated to FIFA
Football teams in Ukraine
football